CCC Development Team is a UCI Continental cycling team based in Poland. Formerly CCC-Mat, the team became known as CCC-Polsat in 2002. In 2004 and 2005, the team was known as Hoop CCC-Polsat, reverting to CCC-Polsat in 2006. From 2007 to 2011, the team was known as CCC-Polsat-Polkowice
(abbreviated to CCC-Polsat), and team kit colours are orange and black.

History

2002
In UCI rankings as of 13 November 2002, CCC Polsat was placed in division 2, in 5th place. The team comprised Cezary Zamana, Artur Krzeszowiec, Jarosław Rębiewski, Radosław Romanik, Krzysztof Szafrański, Quintino Rodrigues (Portugal), Andrei Tietieruk (Kazakhstan), Piotr Przydział, Ondřej Sosenka (Czech Republic), Dawid Krupa, Tomasz Kłoczko, Jarosław Zarębski, Dariusz Skoczylas, Felice Puttini (Switzerland), Serhiy Ushakov (Russia), and Jacek Mickiewicz. In 2002, Ondřej Sosenka won the Czech Championship (25 June 2002), the Course de la Paix (Peace Race) (10–18 May 2002), and the ASY Fiata AutoPoland (25–28 September 2002).

2003
In 2003, team member, Ondřej Sosenka, won the Okolo Slovenska (27–31 August 2003) (overall win and stages 4 and 5).

In this year, CCC-Polsat was the first Polish team to ride a Grand Tour, the Giro d'Italia. The Giro team also included Piotr Chmielewski, Seweryn Kohut, Piotr Przydział, Radosław Romanik, Dariusz Baranowski, Tomasz Brożyna, Andris Naudužs, and Bogdan Bondariew. CCC Polsat's team manager was Andrzej Sypythowski. The colours of the team kit at this time were orange, yellow, and red, with black lettering.

2004
In 2004, the team was in division 3, and won 14 victories and 184 UCI-Points. The team included Sławomir Kohut, Piotr Przydział, Alexei Markov, Radosław Romanik, Plamen Stoyanov, Arkadiusz Wojtas, and Jarosław Zarebski.

2005
In 2005, the team was in division 3. Paweł Osuch was team manager. Riders included Alexei Markov, Jacek Mickiewicz, Łukasz Bodnar, Jarosław Zarebski, Piotr Przydział, Radosław Romanik, Arkadiusz Wojtas, Alexei Sivakov (Russia), Seweryn Kohut, Slawomir Kohut, Marek Galinski, Jonathan Page (USA), and Mariusz Kowal.

2006
Piotr Wadecki, Adam Wadecki, and Marek Wesoły rode for CCC Polsat in 2006.

2007
The 2007 team includes Adrian Brzózka, Piotr Brzózka, Adrian Faltyn, Marek Galiński, Adam Grzeziółkowski, Krzysztof Jeżowski, Tomasz Kiendyś, Tomasz Lisowicz, Mateusz Mróz, Mariusz Olesek, Jarosław Rębiewski, Paweł Szaniawski, Marek Wesoły, Daniel Zywer, Tomasz Zywer, and Grzegorz Żołędziowski. Sports director is Marek Leśniewski, technical director is Jacek Bodyk, and team manager is Zbigniew Misztal.

2018
In July 2018 the team announced they would merge with BMC Racing Team for the 2019 season.

Team roster

Major wins

2000
Stage 9 Course de la Paix, Dainis Ozols
Stage 5 Course de la Solidarité Olympique, Dimitri Sedun
Stage 1 Bałtyk–Karkonosze Tour, Piotr Zaradny
Stage 5a Bałtyk–Karkonosze Tour, Radosław Romanik
Stage 4 Dookoła Mazowsza, Piotr Zaradny
Overall Tour de Pologne, Piotr Przydział

2001
Stage 3 Szlakiem Grodów Piastowskich, Ondřej Sosenka
GP Weltour, Piotr Przydział
Lubelski Wyścig 3-Majowy, Piotr Przydział
Stage 1 FBD Milk Ras, David McCann
Overall Bałtyk–Karkonosze Tour, Piotr Przydział
Stage 5, Radosław Romanik
 Time Trial Championships, Ondřej Sosenka
 Road Race Championships, Radosław Romanik
 Time Trial Championships, Piotr Przydział
 Road Race Championships, David McCann
 Time Trial Championships, David McCann
Overall Course de la Solidarité Olympique, Ondřej Sosenka
Stage 4b, Ondřej Sosenka
Overall Bohemia Tour, Ondřej Sosenka
Stages 1, 3 & 4, Ondřej Sosenka
Overall Tour de Pologne, Ondřej Sosenka
Stage 7b, Ondřej Sosenka
Overall Course 4 Asy Fiata Autopoland, Ondřej Sosenka
Stage 2a, Ondřej Sosenka

2002
Stage 4 GP Mosqueteiros, Andrey Teteryuk
Stage 3 Vuelta del Uruguay, Jarosław Zarębski
Stage 2 Settimana Ciclistica Lombarda, Andrey Teteryuk
Overall Szlakiem Grodów Piastowskich, Krzysztof Szafrański
Stages 1 & 2b, Jacek Mickiewicz
Overall Course de la Paix, Ondřej Sosenka
Stages 4 & 9, Ondřej Sosenka
Stage 6b, Jacek Mickiewicz
Stage 2 Euskal Bizikleta, Serguei Outschakov
GP Ostrowca Świętokrzyskiego, Jacek Mickiewicz
 Time Trial Championships, Ondřej Sosenka
 Time Trial Championships, Krzysztof Szafrański
Overall Course de la Solidarité Olympique, Radosław Romanik
Stages 2 & 4, Jacek Mickiewicz
Stage 5a, Ondřej Sosenka
Stage 2 Bohemia Tour, Ondřej Sosenka
Overall Dookoła Mazowsza, Jacek Mickiewicz
Stages 1 & 5, Jacek Mickiewicz
Stage 3, Tomasz Kłoczko
Szlakiem Walk Majora Hubala, Radosław Romanik
Memoriał Henryka Łasaka, Cezary Zamana
Stage 6 Tour de Pologne, Cezary Zamana
Stage 7b Tour de Pologne, Ondřej Sosenka
Overall Course 4 Asy Fiata Autopoland, Ondřej Sosenka
Stage 2b, Jarosław Zarębski
Stage 3, Cezary Zamana

2003
Stage 2a Szlakiem Grodów Piastowskich, Bogdan Bondariev
Stage 4 Course de la Paix, Ondřej Sosenka
 Road Race Championships, Piotr Przydział
 Road Race Championships, Andris Naudužs
Stage 2 Course de la Solidarité Olympique, Tomasz Brożyna
Stage 2 Bohemia Tour, Seweryn Kohut
Stage 3 Dookoła Mazowsza, Andris Naudužs
Stage 4 Dookoła Mazowsza, Piotr Chmielewski
Stage 5 Dookoła Mazowsza, Bogdan Bondariev
Stage 3 Tour of Małopolska, Piotr Chmielewski
Stage 4 Tour of Małopolska, Radosław Romanik
Overall Okolo Slovenska, Ondřej Sosenka
Stages 4 & 5, Ondřej Sosenka

2004
Stages 2 & 7 Tour de Normandie, Alexei Markov
Stage 4 Settimana Ciclistica Lombarda, Sławomir Kohut
Overall Szlakiem Grodów Piastowskich, Piotr Przydział
Stage 2, Jarosław Zarębski
Stage 4, Piotr Przydział
Miedzynarodowy 3-Majowy Wyścig, Piotr Przydział
Stage 6 Course de la Paix, Sławomir Kohut
Overall Bałtyk–Karkonosze Tour, Sławomir Kohut
Stage 5, Sławomir Kohut
Stage 4 Tour de Beauce, Radosław Romanik
 Time Trial Championships, Sławomir Kohut
 Road Race Championships, Plamen Stoyanov
Puchar Uzdrowisk Karpackich, Arkadiusz Wojtas

2006
Memoriał Andrzeja Trochanowskiego, Piotr Chmielewski
Stage 4 Bałtyk–Karkonosze Tour, Paweł Szaniawski
Stage 3 Dookoła Mazowsza, Marek Wesoły

2007
Grand Prix de la ville de Nogent-sur-Oise, Mateusz Mróz
Memoriał Andrzeja Trochanowskiego, Tomasz Lisowicz
Overall Szlakiem Grodów Piastowskich, Tomasz Kiendyś
Stages 1 & 2, Tomasz Kiendyś
Prologue Flèche du Sud, Tomasz Kiendyś
Stagee 3 Flèche du Sud, Grzegorz Żołędziowski
Stage 3 Bałtyk–Karkonosze Tour, Krzysztof Jeżowski
Stage 4 Bałtyk–Karkonosze Tour, Marek Wesoły
Overall Dookoła Mazowsza, Marek Wesoły
Stages 3 & 5, Marek Wesoły
Stage 2 Tour of Małopolska, Krzysztof Jeżowski
Puchar Uzdrowisk Karpackich, Mateusz Mróz
Memoriał Henryka Łasaka, Krzysztof Jeżowski
Overall Szlakiem Walk Majora Hubala, Tomasz Kiendyś
Stage 2, Krzysztof Jeżowski

2008
Stages 2 & 8 Tour de Taiwan, Marek Wesoły
Stage 4 Tour de Taiwan, Krzysztof Jeżowski
Memoriał Andrzeja Trochanowskiego, Tomasz Kiendyś
3-Majowy Wyścig, Mateusz Mróz
Stage 3 Szlakiem Grodów Piastowskich, Krzysztof Jeżowski
Stage 4 Szlakiem Grodów Piastowskich, Tomasz Kiendyś
GP Jasna Góra-Częstochowa, Tomasz Kiendyś
Stage 1 Bałtyk–Karkonosze Tour, Marek Wesoły
Stage 7 Bałtyk–Karkonosze Tour, Jarosław Rębiewski
Stages 3 & 5 Course de la Solidarité Olympique, Marek Wesoły
Stage 7 Course de la Solidarité Olympique, Mateusz Mróz
Stage 3 Dookoła Mazowsza, Marek Wesoły
Stage 6 Dookoła Mazowsza, Tomasz Kiendyś
Stage 2 Tour of Małopolska, Krzysztof Jeżowski
Stage 4 Tour of Małopolska, Jarosław Rębiewski
Memoriał Henryka Łasaka, Krzysztof Jeżowski
Overall Szlakiem Walk Majora Hubala, Tomasz Kiendyś
Stage 2, Tomasz Kiendyś
Stage 3, Krzysztof Jeżowski

2009
Overall Tour de Taiwan, Krzysztof Jeżowski
Stages 3 & 6, Krzysztof Jeżowski
Stage 7, Tomasz Kiendyś
Stages 1, 6, 9 & 10 Tour du Maroc, Krzysztof Jeżowski
Stage 2 Tour du Maroc, Adrian Honkisz
Stage 5 Tour du Maroc, Tomasz Kiendyś
Stage 8 Tour du Maroc, Łukasz Bodnar
Stage 3 Szlakiem Grodów Piastowskich, Tomasz Smoleń
Stage 2 Tour of Małopolska, Krzysztof Jeżowski
Stage 3 Tour of Małopolska, Tomasz Smoleń
 Road Race Championships, Krzysztof Jeżowski
Stage 6 Course de la Solidarité Olympique, Bartłomiej Matysiak
Overall Dookoła Mazowsza, Łukasz Bodnar
Stage 3, Łukasz Bodnar
Stage 4, Krzysztof Jeżowski
Puchar Ministra Obrony Narodowej, Tomasz Kiendyś

2010
Stage 6 Tour de Taiwan, Tomasz Smoleń
Stage 2 Szlakiem Grodów Piastowskich, Tomasz Marczyński
Stage 3 Szlakiem Grodów Piastowskich, Łukasz Bodnar
Overall Coupe des Carpathes, Adrian Honkisz
Stage 3 & 4, Adrian Honkisz
Stage 2 Tour of Małopolska, Adam Sznitko
Stage 3 Tour of Małopolska, Tomasz Smoleń
Puchar Ministra Obrony Narodowej, Bartłomiej Matysiak
Overall Szlakiem Walk Majora Hubala, Tomasz Kiendyś
Stage 1, Tomasz Kiendyś
Stage 2, Adrian Honkisz
Overall Tour de Seoul, Tomasz Marczyński
Stage 1, Tomasz Marczyński

2011
Memoriał Andrzeja Trochanowskiego, André Schulze
Stage 4 Szlakiem Grodów Piastowskich, Marek Rutkiewicz
Neuseen Classics, André Schulze
Overall Tour of Małopolska, Tomasz Marczyński
Stage 2, Marek Rutkiewicz
 Road Race Championships, Tomasz Marczyński
 Time Trial Championships, Tomasz Marczyński
Stage 2 Course de la Solidarité Olympique, André Schulze
Stage 2 Tour of Qinghai Lake, Mateusz Taciak
Prologue Dookoła Mazowsza, André Schulze
Coupe des Carpathes, Jacek Morajko
Puchar Ministra Obrony Narodowej, Tomasz Kiendyś

2012
 Time Trial Championships, Nikolay Mihaylov
Overall Circuit des Ardennes, Marek Rutkiewicz
Overall Szlakiem Grodów Piastowskich, Marek Rutkiewicz
Stage 2 (ITT), Marek Rutkiewicz
Overall Tour of Małopolska, Marek Rutkiewicz
Stage 3, Marek Rutkiewicz
Stage 4 Course de la Solidarité Olympique, Adrian Honkisz
Overall Dookoła Mazowsza, Mateusz Taciak
Stage 2, Grzegorz Stępniak
Memoriał Henryka Łasaka, Sylwester Janiszewski
Coupe des Carpathes, Sylwester Janiszewski

2013
Stages 1 & 4 Szlakiem Grodów Piastowskich, Davide Rebellin
Stage 3 Tour of Estonia, Bartłomiej Matysiak
 Under-23 Time Trial Championships, Josef Černý
Overall Sibiu Cycling Tour, Davide Rebellin
Stage 1, Davide Rebellin
Stages 1 & 5 Dookoła Mazowsza, Grzegorz Stępniak
Coupe des Carpathes, Adrian Honkisz
Puchar Ministra Obrony Narodowej, Bartłomiej Matysiak

2014
Overall Szlakiem Grodów Piastowskich, Mateusz Taciak
Visegrad 4 Bicycle Race – GP Czech Republic, Josef Černý
Overall Tour of Norway, Maciej Paterski
Stage 2 Tour of Estonia, Adrian Kurek
Stage 1 Tour of Małopolska, Bartłomiej Matysiak
Stage 1 Memorial Grundmanna I Wizowskiego, Bartłomiej Matysiak
 Road Race Championships, Bartłomiej Matysiak
 Road Race Championships, Nikolay Mihaylov
Stage 3 Course de la Solidarité Olympique, Grzegorz Stępniak
Stage 5 Course de la Solidarité Olympique, Jacek Morajko
Stage 2 Cycling Tour of Sibiu, Branislau Samoilau
Stage 3a Cycling Tour of Sibiu, Team time trial
Overall Dookoła Mazowsza, Jarosław Marycz
Stage 1, Team time trial
Memoriał Henryka Łasaka, Maciej Paterski
Giro dell'Emilia, Davide Rebellin

2015
Stage 1 Volta a Catalunya, Maciej Paterski
Stage 1b Settimana Internazionale di Coppi e Bartali, Team time trial
Overall Tour of Croatia, Maciej Paterski
Stage 1, Grega Bole
Stages 3 & 5, Maciej Paterski
Stage 3 Tour of Turkey, Davide Rebellin
Overall Bałtyk–Karkonosze Tour, Leszek Pluciński
Stage 2, Grzegorz Stępniak
Stage 5 (ITT), Mateusz Taciak
Stage 3 Tour of Małopolska, Adrian Kurek
 U23 Time Trial Championships, Josef Černý
 U23 Road Race Championships, Michał Paluta
 Road Race Championships, Nikolay Mihaylov
 Time Trial Championships, Nikolay Mihaylov
Prologue Podlasie Tour, Adrian Kurek
Overall Dookoła Mazowsza, Grzegorz Stępniak
Coppa Ugo Agostoni, Davide Rebellin

2016
Stage 1 Carpathian Couriers Race, Alan Banaszek
Stage 2 Carpathian Couriers Race, Michał Paluta
Visegrad 4 Bicycle Race – GP Poland, Łukasz Owsian
Overall Bałtyk–Karkonosze Tour, Mateusz Taciak
Stage 5 (ITT), Mateusz Taciak
Stage 6, Maciej Paterski
Overall Tour of Estonia, Grzegorz Stępniak
Stage 1, Grzegorz Stępniak
 U23 Time Trial Championships, Patryk Stosz
Overall Tour of Małopolska, Mateusz Taciak
Overall Tour of Austria, Jan Hirt
Stage 4, Jan Hirt
Stage 2 Sibiu Cycling Tour, Nikolay Mihaylov

2017
 Track Championships (Points race), František Sisr
International Rhodes Grand Prix, Alan Banaszek
Stage 1b Settimana Internazionale di Coppi e Bartali, Team time trial
Stage 2 Carpathian Couriers Race U-23, Kamil Małecki
Stage 3 CCC Tour – Grody Piastowskie, Alan Banaszek
Overall Szlakiem Walk Majora Hubala, Maciej Paterski
Stage 1, Maciej Paterski
Overall Okolo Slovenska, Jan Tratnik
Prologue, Jan Tratnik
Overall Tour of Małopolska, Maciej Paterski
Stages 2 & 3, Maciej Paterski
Grand Prix Doliny Baryczy Milicz, Alan Banaszek
 U23 Time Trial Championships, Piotr Brożyna
 Road Race Championships, Adrian Kurek
Stage 2 Course de Solidarność et des Champions Olympiques, Alan Banaszek
Coupe des Carpathes, Maciej Paterski

2018
Ronde van Drenthe, František Sisr
Stage 4 (ITT) Settimana Internazionale di Coppi e Bartali, Jan Tratnik
Volta Limburg Classic, Jan Tratnik
Overall CCC Tour – Grody Piastowskie, Łukasz Owsian
Stage 1 (ITT), Jan Tratnik
Stage 3, Łukasz Owsian
Visegrad 4 Kerékpárverseny, František Sisr
Stage 4 (ITT) Bałtyk–Karkonosze Tour, Mateusz Taciak
Overall Szlakiem Walk Majora Hubala, Mateusz Taciak
 Time Trial Championships, Jan Tratnik
Overall Tour of Małopolska, Amaro Antunes
Stage 3, Amaro Antunes
Grand Prix Doliny Baryczy Zmigrod, Łukasz Owsian
Grand Prix Doliny Baryczy Milicz, Kamil Małecki
Stage 3a Sibiu Cycling Tour, Team time trial
Overall Dookoła Mazowsza, Szymon Sajnok
Prologue, Stages 1 & 2, Szymon Sajnok

2019
Stage 1 Istrian Spring Trophy, Attila Valter
Stages 3 & 5 Carpathian Couriers Race, Stanisław Aniołkowski
 Overall CCC Tour – Grody Piastowskie, Kamil Małecki
Stage 1b, Kamil Małecki
 Overall Bałtyk–Karkonosze Tour, Kamil Małecki
Stage 4 (ITT), Kamil Małecki
Stage 2a (ITT) Szlakiem Walk Majora Hubala, Szymon Tracz
Korona Kocich Gór, Patryk Stosz
Stage 4 Course de Solidarność et des Champions Olympiques, Stanisław Aniołkowski
 Time Trial Championships, Attila Valter
 Road Race Championships, Michał Paluta
 Overall Dookoła Mazowsza, Stanisław Aniołkowski
Stage 3, Stanisław Aniołkowski
Stage 1 Tour of Almaty, Patryk Stosz
Stages 2 & 5 Tour of Romania, Stanisław Aniołkowski

2020
 U23 Time Trial Championships, Szymon Krawczyk
 Road Race Championships, Stanisław Aniołkowski
 Overall Bałtyk–Karkonosze Tour, Stanisław Aniołkowski
Stage 4, Stanisław Aniołkowski
 Overall Course de Solidarność et des Champions Olympiques, Stanisław Aniołkowski
Stage 3, Stanisław Aniołkowski
Stage 1 Tour of Małopolska, Stanisław Aniołkowski
Stage 2 Giro del Friuli-Venezia Giulia, Szymon Krawczyk
GP Slovakia, Stanisław Aniołkowski

National champions

2001
 Czech Time Trial, Ondřej Sosenka
 Poland Road Race, Radosław Romanik
  Poland Time Trial, Piotr Przydział
 Ireland Road Race, David McCann
 Ireland Time Trial, David McCann
2002
 Czech Time Trial, Ondřej Sosenka
  Poland Time Trial, Krzysztof Szafrański
2003
  Poland Road Race, Piotr Przydział
  Latvia Road Race, Andris Naudužs
2004
  Poland Time Trial, Sławomir Kohut
 Bulgaria Road Race, Plamen Stoyanov
2009
  Poland Road Race, Krzysztof Jeżowski
2011
 Poland Road Race, Tomasz Marczyński
 Poland Time Trial, Tomasz Marczyński
2012
 Bulgaria Time Trial, Nikolay Mihaylov
2013
 Czech Under-23 Time Trial, Josef Černý
2014
 Poland Road Race, Bartłomiej Matysiak
 Bulgaria Road Race, Nikolay Mihaylov
2015
 Czech Under-23 Time Trial, Josef Černý
 Poland Under-23 Road Race, Michał Paluta
 Bulgaria Road Race, Nikolay Mihaylov
2016
 Poland Under-23 Time Trial, Patryk Stosz
2017
 Czech Track (Points race), František Sisr
 Poland Under-23 Time Trial, Piotr Brożyna
2019
 Hungary Time Trial, Attila Valter
 Poland Road Race, Michał Paluta
2020
 Poland Under-23 Time Trial, Szymon Krawczyk
 Poland Road Race, Stanislaw Aniolkowski

References

External links
 

Cycling teams based in Poland
Cycling teams established in 2000
Former UCI Professional Continental teams
UCI Continental Teams (Europe)